This is a list of plantations in North Carolina that are National Historic Landmarks, listed on the National Register of Historic Places, listed on a heritage register, or are otherwise significant for their history, association with significant events or people, or their architecture and design.

Definition of a plantation 

Today, as was also true in the past, there is a wide range of opinion as to what differentiated a plantation from a farm. Typically, the focus of a farm was subsistence agriculture. In contrast, the primary focus of a plantation was the production of cash crops, with enough staple food crops produced to feed the population of the estate and the livestock. A common definition of what constituted a plantation is that it typically had  or more of land and produced one or two cash crops for sale. Other scholars have attempted to define it by the number of slaves that were owned.

North Carolina plantations
The tables of plantations below are sortable, so the name, locality, county (current), historic register number, and built in years can be easily reviewed.  References can be found on the individual articles linked or are noted if there are no articles.  Comparisons to similar referenced listings are in progress.

Built during the Province of North Carolina period
North Carolina plantation were identified by name, beginning in the 17th century. The names of families or nearby rivers or other features were used. The names assisted the owners and local record keepers in keeping track of specific parcels of land.  In the early 1900s, there were 328 plantations identified in North Carolina from extant records.

The Sloop Point plantation in Pender County, built in 1729, is the oldest surviving plantation house and the second oldest house surviving in North Carolina, after the Lane House (built in 17181719 and not part of a plantation).  Sloop Point was once owned by John Baptista Ashe, who was a delegate to the Continental Congress, U.S. Congressman from North Carolina and Continental Army officer.

The known plantations during the period of the Province of North Carolina (17121776) are listed in the table below.

Built from 1776 to 1863
The following table shows the plantations in North Carolina that were built between 1776 and the end of the Civil War.

Plantations built after the civil war
Some plantations were built after the civil war and abolition of slavery.

Notable plantation owners
The following persons were large plantation owners for which the plantation has not yet been identified.
 John H. Wheeler:  (1806–1882) was an American planter, slaveowner, attorney, politician and historian who served as North Carolina State Treasurer (1843–1845) and as United States Minister to Nicaragua (1855–1856)
 William Lenoir:  (May 8, 1751 – May 6, 1839) was an American Revolutionary War officer and prominent statesman in late 18th-century and early 19th-century North Carolina.

See also

History of slavery in North Carolina
Plantation complexes in the Southern United States
List of plantations in the United States

Originally form Virginia the J.A. Evans Family moved from Edgecombe County, N.C. through Nash County, N.C. to Pine Level in Johnston County, N.C. in 1850 A.D. and started a farm which eventually through land purchases became the 6,000 acre Tall Pines Plantation,Founded in 1870 A.D. by Jane Barns Evans widow of  J.A. Evans CSA. The family lost control of the property in 1938 A.D. after the Great Financial Depression and gained some compensation for the land through legal action taking by the Evans family in 1947 A.D. Descendants of the J.A. Evans Family in 2020 A.D. were still living in the Pine Level area. 
 
Jane Barnes Evans was a cotton Baroness and part owner of the North Carolina Railroad which ran through part of her 
Tall Pines Plantation which supplied fresh water to the North Carolina Railroad for the use of steam engine locomotives.

References

 List of plantations in North Carolina
 List of plantations in North Carolina
 List of plantations in North Carolina
North Carolina
Plantations
North Carolina